In geometry, a symmetry mutation is a mapping of fundamental domains between two symmetry groups. They are compactly expressed in orbifold notation. These mutations can occur from spherical tilings to Euclidean tilings to hyperbolic tilings. Hyperbolic tilings can also be divided between compact, paracompact and divergent cases.

The uniform tilings are the simplest application of these mutations, although more complex patterns can be expressed within a fundamental domain.

This article expressed progressive sequences of uniform tilings within symmetry families.

Mutations of orbifolds 

Orbifolds with the same structure can be mutated between different symmetry classes, including across curvature domains from spherical, to Euclidean to hyperbolic. This table shows mutation classes. This table is not complete for possible hyperbolic orbifolds.

*n22 symmetry

Regular tilings

Prism tilings

Antiprism tilings

*n32 symmetry

Regular tilings

Truncated tilings

Quasiregular tilings

Expanded tilings

Omnitruncated tilings

Snub tilings

*n42 symmetry

Regular tilings

Quasiregular tilings

Truncated tilings

Expanded tilings

Omnitruncated tilings

Snub tilings

*n52 symmetry

Regular tilings

*n62 symmetry

Regular tilings

*n82 symmetry

Regular tilings

References

Sources 
 John H. Conway, Heidi Burgiel, Chaim Goodman-Strass, The Symmetries of Things 2008,  
 From hyperbolic 2-space to Euclidean 3-space: Tilings and patterns via topology Stephen Hyde

Polyhedra
Euclidean tilings
Hyperbolic tilings